The Korean Vertical Launching System (K-VLS or KVLS) is a vertical launch weapon system developed by South Korea to be deployed by the Republic of Korea Navy. It is used in the Sejong the Great-class destroyer, and is scheduled to be added to the Daegu-class frigate. The K-VLS can deploy the Cheolmae-2 air defense missile, Hong Sang Eo anti-submarine missile, Haeseong-II, Hyunmoo-3 land attack cruise missiles and even SLBMs.

Ships using KVLS

See also
 Vertical launching system
 Mark 41 Vertical Launching System
 Sylver Vertical Launching System

References

Ship-based missile launchers
Post–Cold War weapons of South Korea
Republic of Korea Navy